Kalga (also called "Kalgha") is a village in Kullu district in the state of Himachal Pradesh, India. The nearest bus stand is at Barshaini. The village attracts crowds during the months of April to July and is a short detour en route on the trek route to Kheerganga.

References 

Villages in Kullu district